Colonel Claud Lechmere St John Tudor  (27 December 1888 – 3 August 1977) was a British Army officer and English cricketer active from 1910 to 1927 who played for Sussex. He was born in Willingdon, Sussex and died in Oxford . He appeared in 19 first-class matches as a righthanded batsman who scored 640 runs with a highest score of 116.

Tudor served with the Royal Army Service Corps. For his services in the First World War, Tudor was awarded the Military Cross, the Serbian Order of the White Eagle (4th class) and invested as an Officer of the Order of the British Empire.

His son was Geoffrey Tudor.

Notes

1888 births
1977 deaths
English cricketers
Sussex cricketers
British Army cricketers
British Army personnel of World War I
Royal Army Service Corps officers
Recipients of the Military Cross
Officers of the Order of the British Empire
People from Willingdon
Military personnel from Sussex